Oliver Koletzki (born in Braunschweig on 5 October 1974) is a German dance and house music producer and DJ. He is currently based in Berlin, Germany.

Koletzki rose to international fame with his track "Der Mückenschwarm" (meaning "the mosquito swarm"), which appeared on the Cocoon Recordings label. Many DJs played his track and thus introduced Koletzki to the charts. "Der Mückenschwarm" was remixed and covered by artists such as Pig & Dan and Dominik Eulberg, which led to worldwide bookings and further releases, notably on Martin Eyerer's Kling Klong. Koletzki founded his own label, Stil vor Talent (Style over Talent) in September 2005. His debut album, Get Wasted, was released in 2007, followed by Großstadtmärchen in 2009, the most successful Lovestoned in 2010 with Fran, Großstadtmärchen 2 in 2012 and I Am OK in 2014.

Awards
Koletzki was chosen as the Best Newcomer 2005 in the reader's poll of Groove Magazine, and "Der Mückenschwarm" was chosen as the Track of the Year 2005 by reader's polls in Groove and in Raveline magazine.

 Discography 
 Albums 

 Singles and EPs 
 Blackout (2005), Stil vor Talent 12"
 Der Mückenschwarm (2005), Cocoon Recordings 12"
 Da bleibt er ganz cool (2006), Kling Klong 12"
 Eferding Berlin (2006), Flash Recordings 12", with Florian Meindl
 Follow Up (2006), Stil vor Talent 12"
 Granulum / Nimbus (2006), Kickboxer 12", with Martin Eyerer
 Yes I Can Fly (2006), Yesionova Recordings 12"
 Don't Forget to Go Home (2007), Stil vor Talent 12"
 Kolibri (2007), Flash Recordings 12", with Florian Meindl
 Music from the Heart (2007), Hell Yeah Recordings 12"
 Pulse Your Hands (2007), Kling Klong 12", with Martin Eyerer
 Hypnotized (2009), Stil vor Talent 12", with Fran
 Arrow and Bow (2010), Stil vor Talent 12", with Fran
 Echoes (2010), Stil vor Talent 12", with Fran
 Iyéwayé / Ipuza (2015), Stil vor Talent 12"
 Zuckerwatte (2015), with Juli Holz
×   50 Ways to love your liver
 Copal (2021)

 Mix-CDs 
 The Process (2006), Resopal Schallware
 Clubload (2006), Polystar Records
 Cocorico Session 01 (2007), Mantra Vibes

 Remixes 
 Mick Rubin – Als es passierte (2005)
 Oliver Huntemann – Radio (2005)
 Cassius – Toop Toop (2006)
 John Acquaviva – Feedback (2006)
 Kai Kurve – Mir ist schlecht (2008)
 Tobias Lützenkirchen – Drei Tage wach (2008)
 Wir sind Helden – Die Wespe (2010)
 Stay - Hurts'' (2010)

References

External links 
 
Discogs: Oliver Koletzki page
MySpace
Stil vor Talent on SoundCloud

1974 births
German DJs
German male musicians
Living people
Musicians from Braunschweig
Electronic dance music DJs